Kangarli or Kengerli or Gangarli or Kengerly may refer to:

Kangarli District, Nakhchivan, Azerbaijan
Kangarli Khanate, an 18-19th century khanate based at Maku, Iran 
Kəngərli, Agdam, a village in Azerbaijan
Kengerli, Sur, Diyabekir, Turkey
Kəngərli, Tartar, a village and municipality in the Tartar District of Azerbaijan
Kangarli tribe — the name of the Azerbaijani tribe

See also
 
 Kangrali (disambiguation)
 Kangarlu (disambiguation), a list of villages in Iran named after the noble Turkic Kangarlu family
 Bala Kəngərli (disambiguation)